In accounting, an accretion expense is a periodic expense recognized when updating the present value of a balance sheet liability, which has arisen from a company's obligation to perform a duty in the future, and is being measured by using a discounted cash flows ("DCF") approach.  
See also Accretion (finance).

In particular, "accretion expense" is a phrase used in topic 410-20 of the United States GAAP Codification of Accounting Standards (SFAS 143), which describes the reporting of asset retirement obligations.  This kind of liability typically has a long and predetermined life on a company's balance sheet, and hence, as mentioned, it is valued via DCF.  The accretion expense amounts to a change in the liability due to time and the discount rate applied.

In general, it is not to be expected that a company's statement dates will coincide with the anniversary dates of these commitments.  Typically, a company prorates its accretion expense based on the amount of time that it maintained the underlying commitment during the period .

Notes

Expense